Star seed or starseed may refer to:
 Starseed, a 1973 book by Timothy Leary
 Star Seed, a 2021 single by Loona
 Starseed (band), South-African/British rock band
 Starseed (novel), a 1991 science fiction novel by Spider Robinson and Jeanne Robinson
 "Starseed" (song), a 1994 single by Our Lady Peace
 Starseed launcher, a hypothetical concept of a space exploration system
 Starseeds, fictional microorganisms used by Outsiders to seed new planets with life in Larry Niven's Known Space science fiction series
 Star seeds, a type of crystal in sentient life in the Sailor Moon: Sailor Stars series

 Star people (New Age), individuals who state they’ve originated from another planet or Galaxy
 A giant machine hypothetized to be able to collapse black holes among other things, in the video game Solar Ash. The McGuffin of the game's story.

See also
 "Space Seed", an episode of the television series Star Trek